Thomas Russell (1693-1745) was Archdeacon of Cork  from 1725 until his death.

Russell  was born in Lisburn and educated at Trinity College, Dublin. He held livings at Killanully, Kilbrittain, Cannaway and Ardnageehy. He was Precentor of Cork from 1720 to 1725; and of Ross from 1724.

References

Alumni of Trinity College Dublin
Archdeacons of Cork
People from Lisburn
18th-century Irish Anglican priests
1693 births
1745 deaths